Alan Marley is a former association football player who represented New Zealand.

Marley made his full All Whites debut in a 4–1 win over New Caledonia on 17 September 1972 and ended his international playing career with 12 A-international caps and 3 goals to his credit, his final cap in a 0–2 loss to Iraq on 13 March 1973. Marley only missed one A-international game between debut and his last selection and scored in three successive games in a four-day period in February 1973. Marley finished his playing days with the successful Brisbane Premier League side North Star FC. Before a falling out with the North Star coach saw him sign for Mt.Gravatt Hawks. Which was coached by Marley's former Qld State teammate Ian Steele for the remainder of the 1986 season.

References

External links

Living people
Year of birth missing (living people)
New Zealand association footballers
New Zealand international footballers
Association football forwards
1973 Oceania Cup players